Dorothy Kozak (17 April 1932 – 14 June 2009) was a Canadian sprinter. She competed in the women's 4 × 100 metres relay at the 1956 Summer Olympics. At the 1954 British Empire and Commonwealth Games, Kozak competed in the 100 yards not progressing past the heats and the 4×110 yards relay winning a bronze medal with Annabelle Murray, Geraldine Bemister and Margery Squires.

References

1932 births
2009 deaths
Athletes (track and field) at the 1956 Summer Olympics
Canadian female sprinters
Canadian female long jumpers
Olympic track and field athletes of Canada
Athletes (track and field) at the 1954 British Empire and Commonwealth Games
Commonwealth Games bronze medallists for Canada
Commonwealth Games medallists in athletics
Athletes from Calgary
Medallists at the 1954 British Empire and Commonwealth Games